Assmannshausen is, since its incorporation in 1977, a quarter of Rüdesheim am Rhein in the Rheingau, located on the Rhine in the state of Hesse, Germany. The village has a lithium spring, spa and a Kurhaus, and is famed for its red wine (Assmannshäuser) made from Pinot noir (German: Spätburgunder), which resembles red Burgundy wine. The Hessische Staatsweingüter Kloster Eberbach are running their VDP red wine estate (Einzellage: Höllenberg, 23.1 ha under vine) in the village.

From Assmannshausen a chairlift ascends the Jagdschloss Niederwald where a 30 minutes hike leads to the Niederwalddenkmal.

The heritage-listed former winery Assmanshausen Winery in Queensland, Australia, was named after this region.

References

External links

Villages in Hesse
Rheingau-Taunus-Kreis
Rheingau